Leif Andersson (born 26 April 1961 in Finspång) is a former Swedish biathlete. At the 1992 Olympics in Albertville, Andersson won a bronze medal in the 4 x 7.5 km relay along with his teammates Mikael Löfgren, Tord Wiksten, and Ulf Johansson. His best individual Olympic placing was eighth, at the 1984 Olympics in Sarajevo.

References

 
 

1961 births
Living people
People from Finspång Municipality
Swedish male biathletes
Olympic biathletes of Sweden
Biathletes at the 1984 Winter Olympics
Biathletes at the 1988 Winter Olympics
Biathletes at the 1992 Winter Olympics
Biathletes at the 1994 Winter Olympics
Olympic medalists in biathlon
Medalists at the 1992 Winter Olympics
Olympic bronze medalists for Sweden
20th-century Swedish people